Jonathan Mason is an English actor. He is known for playing the lead role of the 2005 version of Lassie.

He is most notable for the part of Joe Carraclough in Lassie and as the roles of James, in Nits and Alistair Fury on The Revenge Files of Alistair Fury.

He also had a minor role in Vincent in 2006. Jonathon studied at Notre Dame Catholic Sixth Form College in Leeds. Jonathan currently studies at Sheffield Hallam University in Sheffield. Mason also had a role in The Race as Mary Kensay's best friend.

Filmography

References

External links
Young star Jonathan is talk of New York (article, 9/2/06)

English male child actors
English male film actors
Male actors from Bradford
Living people
1996 births